Bangor West railway station is located in the townland of Ballyvarnet in Bangor, County Down, Northern Ireland.

It was opened on 1 June 1928 by the Belfast and County Down Railway to serve the rapidly expanding suburbs of Bangor. It was initially provided with a wooden structure on the up side to function as waiting room and ticket office.

It was replaced with a simple, more robust concrete structure in 1978. It remains one of the few intermediate suburban stations in Northern Ireland to retain a ticket office. This is owed to the station's high popularity and usage, being served by the Bangor express train, one of the few stations in North Down to be served.

Service

Extra services operate at peak times, and the service reduces to hourly in the evenings.

On Sundays there is an hourly service in each direction.

References

Railway stations in County Down
Bangor, County Down
Railway stations opened in 1928
Railway stations served by NI Railways
Railway stations in Northern Ireland opened in the 20th century